New York State Route 187 (NY 187) is a short state highway located entirely in Erie County, New York, in the United States. It serves as the southern end of the busy Transit Road in the town of Elma. Its southern terminus is at Quaker Road (U.S. Route 20A or US 20A) and its northern terminus at US 20 where that highway becomes Transit Road. Unlike much of the rest of Transit, which is mostly designated as part of NY 78, the NY 187 portion is lightly trafficked, two-lane and largely undeveloped. NY 187 was assigned in the early 1940s and was previously part of NY 78.

Route description 

NY 187 begins at an intersection with US 20A (Quaker Road) as a continuation of County Route 553 (CR 553). It takes on CR 553's name, Transit Road, and progresses northward as a two-lane road. The highway serves the nearby Bob-O-Link Golf Course prior to entering a stretch of fields in Orchard Park, where it intersects with CR 460 (Milestrip Road), the eastward continuation of NY 179. The route continues on, loosely paralleling Cazenovia Creek and intersecting Michael and Willardshire roads (CR 365 and CR 377, respectively) before passing the Harvest Hill Golf Course in Elma. NY 187 soon intersects with Reserve Road, an east–west connection from US 20 eastbound, before turning to the northwest and terminating at its own junction with US 20. The Transit Road designation continues north onto US 20.

History
When NY 78 was assigned as part of the 1930 renumbering of state highways in New York, it initially bypassed the southeastern Buffalo suburbs on a routing that passed through the village of East Aurora, the hamlet of Elma, and the village of Lancaster. It was rerouted  to head west from East Aurora instead by way of an overlap with US 20 (now US 20A), then head north on Transit Road to rejoin its former routing in Depew. NY 78 was realigned again  to overlap NY 16 northwest from East Aurora, bypassing the southernmost portion of Transit Road. The former routing of NY 78 between US 20A and US 20 was redesignated as NY 187 in the early 1940s.

Major intersections

See also

References

External links

187
Transportation in Erie County, New York